In the United States, a Hallmark holiday is a holiday that is perceived to exist primarily for commercial purposes, rather than to commemorate a traditionally or historically significant event.

Background
The name comes from Hallmark Cards, a privately owned American company, that benefits from such manufactured events through sales of greeting cards and other items.

Holidays that have been referred to as "Hallmark holidays" 
Valentine's Day
Mother's Day
Father's Day
Grandparents Day
National Son's Day
National Daughter's Day
Sweetest Day
Boss's Day
Administrative Professionals' Day
Teacher Appreciation Day, Clergy Appreciation Day
Graduation Day

See also

 Anna Jarvis and Mother's Day
 Christmas in July in the Northern Hemisphere
 Valentine's Day
 List of food days

References

Further reading

 
 

Greeting cards
Hallmark Cards
Holidays
Pejorative terms